Chippewa Lake (formerly Chippewa-on-the-Lake) is a village in Medina County, Ohio, United States. It is located on Chippewa Lake, a natural inland lake in Ohio. The village was incorporated in 1920.  The population was 711 at the 2010 census.

Geography 
Chippewa Lake is located at  (41.074039, -81.903753).

Climate

History 
Chippewa Lake took its name from the Ojibwe tribe of Native Americans.

In the 1880s, Oscar Townsend and the Cleveland, Lorain, & Wheeling Railroad developed a prosperous vacation resort, eventually called Chippewa Lake Park, on the banks of Chippewa Lake. The Great Depression and extinction of interurban rail service crippled the park, but in 1937, Parker Beach purchased the resort, and it enjoyed a swinging Golden Age through 1969, as he kept the park's ballroom filled with dancers and famous bands. In 1978, after more than 100 years of operation, Chippewa Lake Park was shut down and left to decay.

In 2008, scenes for the horror film Closed For the Season (released in 2010) were shot at the abandoned amusement park, using many of its decrepit attractions as backgrounds.

A large estate that was originally part of Townsend's empire in town remains intact today, and has operated for decades as The Oaks Lodge restaurant.

Demographics

2010 census
As of the census of 2010, there were 711 people, 311 households, and 188 families living in the village. The racial makeup of the village was 97.2% White, 0.6% African American, 0.3% Native American, 0.8% from other races, and 1.1% from two or more races. Hispanic or Latino of any race were 1.4% of the population.

There were 311 households, of which 26.4% had children under the age of 18 living with them, 43.1% were married couples living together, 10.9% had a female householder with no husband present, 6.4% had a male householder with no wife present, and 39.5% were non-families. 32.5% of all households were made up of individuals, and 11.9% had someone living alone who was 65 years of age or older. The average household size was 2.29 and the average family size was 2.89.

The median age in the village was 42.6 years. 19.7% of residents were under the age of 18; 8.7% were between the ages of 18 and 24; 25.1% were from 25 to 44; 33.8% were from 45 to 64; and 12.7% were 65 years of age or older. The gender makeup of the village was 51.2% male and 48.8% female.

2000 census
As of the census of 2000, there were 823 people, 331 households, and 217 families living in the village. The population density was 3,035.2 people per square mile (1,176.9/km2). There were 395 housing units at an average density of 1,456.8 per square mile (564.9/km2). The racial makeup of the village was 99.03% White, 0.12% African American, 0.24% Asian, 0.24% from other races, and 0.36% from two or more races. Hispanic or Latino of any race were 0.61% of the population.

There were 331 households, out of which 31.4% had children under the age of 18 living with them, 50.8% were married couples living together, 10.0% had a female householder with no husband present, and 34.4% were non-families. 27.8% of all households were made up of individuals, and 6.0% had someone living alone who was 65 years of age or older. The average household size was 2.49 and the average family size was 3.07.

In the village, the population was spread out, with 24.9% under the age of 18, 8.0% from 18 to 24, 31.7% from 25 to 44, 26.2% from 45 to 64, and 9.1% who were 65 years of age or older. The median age was 37 years. For every 100 females there were 108.4 males. For every 100 females age 18 and over, there were 104.0 males.

The median income for a household in the village was $43,667, and the median income for a family was $49,531. Males had a median income of $40,000 versus $26,667 for females. The per capita income for the village was $19,115. About 5.4% of families and 9.2% of the population were below the poverty line, including 13.3% of those under age 18 and 4.4% of those age 65 or over.

References

Further reading
 Diane Demali Francis, Chippewa Lake Park (Images of America), Arcadia Publishing, 2004, 
 Sharon L. Kraynek, Chippewa Lake Park (Ohio) 1800-1978, Diary of an Amusement Park, 1988

Villages in Medina County, Ohio
Villages in Ohio